The 44th Infantry Division "Cremona" was an infantry division of the Royal Italian Army during World War II. The Cremona was formed on 15 September 1939 by splitting the 20th Infantry Division "Curtatone and Montanara" into the 20th Infantry Division "Friuli" and 44th Infantry Division "Cremona". The division was named for the city of Cremona. The division served as occupation force on Corsica and fought German units after the Armistice of Cassibile was announced on 8 September 1943. The division then served with the Italian Co-belligerent Army and remained active until the 1975 Italian Army reform.

History 
After the Second Italian War of Independence the Austrian Empire had to cede the Lombardy region of the Kingdom of Lombardy–Venetia to the Kingdom of Sardinia. After taking control of the region the government of Sardinia ordered the Royal Sardinian Army on 29 August 1859 to raise five infantry brigades and one grenadier brigade in Lombardy. Subsequently on 1 November 1859 the Brigade "Cremona" was activated with the 21st Infantry Regiment and 22nd Infantry Regiment, which had been re-raised on 29 August 1859

World War I 
During World War I the brigade fought on the Italian front, for which its two regiments were each a awarded a Silver Medal of Military Valour.

Interwar years 
On 28 December 1926 the brigade assumed the name of XX Infantry Brigade and received the 88th Infantry Regiment "Friuli" from the disbanded Brigade "Friuli". The XX Infantry Brigade was the infantry component of the 20th Territorial Division of Livorno, which also included the 7th Artillery Regiment. In 1934 the division changed its name to 20th Infantry Division "Curtatone e Montanara".

On 15 September 1939 the Curtatone e Montanara transferred all its regiments, except the 88th Infantry Regiment "Friuli", to the newly activated 44th Infantry Division "Cremona" in Pisa. The Curtatone e Montanara was subsequently renamed 20th Infantry Division "Friuli".

World War II 
On 10 June 1940 Italy entered World War II by invading France. The Cremona was in the second echelon near Ventimiglia behind the 5th Infantry Division "Cosseria". The Cremona provided some fire support during hostilities.

Sardinia 
In February 1941 the division was ordered to transfer to northern Sardinia. While the Cremona was in Sardinia its regimental depots in Tuscany raised most units of the 80th Infantry Division "La Spezia": the 126th Infantry Regiment "La Spezia" was raised in Pisa on 5 November 1941 by the 22nd Infantry Regiment "Cremona", while the 80th Artillery Regiment "La Spezia" was raised in Pisa by the 7th Artillery Regiment "Cremona". In parallel the regimental depot of the 88th Infantry Regiment "Friuli" of the Friuli division raised the 125th Infantry Regiment "La Spezia" in Livorno on 5 November 1941.

Corsica 
On 8 November 1942 Allied forces landed in French North Africa and Germany and Italy reacted by occupying Vichy France. On 11 November 1942 the Cremona was ferried from Sardinia to southern Corsica, while its sister division Friuli was ferried from Livorno to northern Corsica. The two divisions, together with the 225th Coastal Division and 226th Coastal Division, were assigned to the Armed Forces Command Corsica / VII Army Corps. On Corsica the Cremona had its headquarter in Ajaccio.

After the Armistice of Cassibile was announced on 8 September 1943 the Italian forces and French partisans on Corsica fought the German Sturmbrigade Reichführer-SS, 90th Panzergrenadier Division, and Italian XXII Paratroopers Battalion/ 184th Infantry Regiment "Nembo", which had crossed over from Sardinia and retreated through Corsica towards the harbor of Bastia in the island's north.

On 13 September elements of the Free French 4th Moroccan Mountain Division landed in Ajaccio to support the Italian efforts to stop the 30,000 retreating German troops, but during the night of 3-4 October the last German units were evacuated from Bastia leaving behind 700 dead and 350 POWs. After the end of operations on Corsica the Cremona was transferred with all other Italian units from Corsica to Sardinia. On November 1943 90th CC.NN. Legion was renamed as 321st Infantry Regiment "Cremona".

Italian Co-belligerent Army  
Now part of the Italian Co-belligerent Army the division was reorganized on 25 September 1944 in Altavilla Irpina as Combat Group "Cremona". The group consisted of 21st and 22nd infantry regiments, 7th Artillery Regiment, and CXLIV Engineer Battalion. The group was commanded by Major General Clemente Primieri. Equipped with British weapons and materiel the group entered the front on 12 January 1945 as part of British V Corps. When allied forces achieved a major breakthrough during the 1945 spring offensive the Cremona advanced towards Venice and liberated the city on 30 April 1945.

After the war the combat group was garrisoned in Turin and on 15 October 1945 the group was renamed Infantry Division "Cremona". For the Cremona's history after World War II see: see Motorized Brigade "Cremona".

Organization 
  44th Infantry Division "Cremona", in Pisa
 21st Infantry Regiment "Cremona", in La Spezia
 Command Company
 3x Fusilier battalions
 Support Weapons Company (65/17 infantry support guns)
 Mortar Company (81mm Mod. 35 mortars)
 22nd Infantry Regiment "Cremona", in Pisa
 Command Company
 3x Fusilier battalions
 Support Weapons Company (65/17 infantry support guns)
 Mortar Company (81mm Mod. 35 mortars)
 7th Artillery Regiment "Cremona", in Pisa
 Command Unit
 I Group (100/17 howitzers)
 II Group (75/27 field guns)
 III Group (75/18 howitzers)
 4th Anti-aircraft Battery (20/65 Mod. 35 anti-aircraft guns)
 Ammunition and Supply Unit
 XLIV Mortar Battalion (81mm Mod. 35 mortars)
 CXLIV Mixed Engineer Battalion (formed in 1943)
 44th Anti-tank Company (47/32 anti-tank guns; replaced in Corsica by the 144th Anti-tank Company)
 44th Telegraph and Radio Operators Company (entered the CXLIV Mixed Engineer Battalion in 1943)
 77th Engineer Company (entered the CXLIV Mixed Engineer Battalion in 1943)
 54th Medical Section
 33rd Field Hospital
 84th Field Hospital
 333rd Field Hospital
 1x Surgical unit
 54th Supply Section
 119th Truck Section
 119th Transport Section
 350th Transport Section (joined the division in Corsica)
 355th Transport Section (joined the division in Corsica)
 17th Bakers Section
 60th Carabinieri Section
 251st Carabinieri Section
 64th Field Post Office

Attached to the division from June 1940 to 10 December 1940:
 XXVIII CC.NN. Battalion

Attached to the division from 10 December 1940:
 90th CC.NN. Legion "Pisa" (renamed 321st Infantry Regiment "Cremona" on 15 November 1943; disbanded 15 September 1944)
 XC CC.NN. Battalion
 CXLIII CC.NN. Battalion
 90th CC.NN. Machine Gun Company

Attached to the division during 1943:
 Special Grenadiers Grouping
 4x Granatieri di Sardegna battalions
 XXI Alpini Battalion "Monte Mercantour"/ 175th Mobile Territorial Alpini Regiment
 IV Bersaglieri Cyclists Battalion
 CXIII Machine Gun Battalion
 DXV Mobile Territorial Battalion
 XXXIV Artillery Group (105/28 howitzers)
 CXXVI Artillery Group (149/13 howitzers)

Attached to the division on 8 September 1943:
 XIII Tank Battalion "L"/ 4th Tank Infantry Regiment (L3/35 tankettes) 
 XXII Alpini Battalion "Monte Granero"/ 175th Mobile Territorial Alpini Regiment
 CVII Machine Gun Battalion
 CXXXI Self-propelled Battalion (47/32 L40 self-propelled guns)
 XXIV Artillery Group (105/28 howitzers)

Commanding officers 
The division's commanding officers were:

 Generale di Divisione Umberto Mondino (15 September 1939 - 14 February 1942)
 Generale di Divisione Nino Sozzani (15 February 1942 - 2 November 1942)
 Generale di Brigata Gioacchino Solinas (3 November 1942 - 6 August 1943)
 Generale di Brigata Clemente Primieri (7 August 1943 - 25 September 1944)

References 

 

Infantry divisions of Italy in World War II
Military units and formations established in 1939
Military units and formations disestablished in 1945